A prisoner is someone incarcerated in a prison, jail or similar facility.

Prisoner(s) or The Prisoner(s) may also refer to:

Literature 
 La Prisonnière (The Prisoner), the fifth volume of Marcel Proust's novel In Search of Lost Time
 The Prisoner, a 1916 novel by Alice Brown
 The Prisoner, the alternate English title of Les Louves, a 1956 French novel by Boileau-Narcejac
 The Prisoner, the fifth novel in the Henderson's Boys series by Robert Muchamore
 "The Prisoner", a short story found in The Soft Voice of the Serpent by South African author Nadine Gordimer
 The Prisoner, a work based on the 1960s television series, by Thomas M. Disch
 The Prisoner, the first volume in the "Kent Family Saga" by Karyn Monk
 "The Prisoner", a 1956 short story by Christopher Anvil

Theatre, film, and television

Theatre
 The Prisoner, English title of Il prigioniero, an Italian opera by Luigi Dallapiccola
 The Prisoners, English title of Captivi, a Latin play by Titus Maccius Plautus
 The Prisoners (play), a Caroline-era stage play by Thomas Killigrew

Film
 The Prisoner (1920 film), a German silent drama film
 The Prisoner (1923 film), featuring Boris Karloff
 Prisoners (1929 film), an early talking film
 The Prisoner (1949 film), a German film
 The Prisoner (1955 film), starring  Sir Alec Guinness
 The Prisoner (1963 film), an Australian TV play
 Island of Fire, a 1991 Hong Kong film starring Jackie Chan also known as The Prisoner
 Prisoners (1982 film), an unreleased US–New Zealand drama film
 The Prisoner (2013 film), a short film
 Prisoners (2013 film), an American thriller film
 The Prisoner or: How I Planned to Kill Tony Blair, a 2007 documentary

TV
 The Prisoner, a 1967–68 UK television series starring Patrick McGoohan
 The Prisoner (video game), a 1980 computer game based upon the series
 The Prisoner (2009 miniseries), a remake of the 1967 series starring Sir Ian McKellen
 Prisoner (TV series), an Australian soap opera that ran from 1979 to 1986, also known as Prisoner: Cell Block H in the UK and the USA and Caged Women in Canada
 "Prisoner" (Law & Order: Criminal Intent), a 2005 episode of Law & Order: Criminal Intent
 "Prisoners" (Gotham), an episode of Gotham
 "Prisoners" (Stargate SG-1), an episode of Stargate SG-1
 "The Prisoners" (The Walking Dead)
 "Chapter 6: The Prisoner", 2019 episode of The Mandalorian

Music 
 The Prisoners (band), British band

Albums 
 Prisoners (album), a 2012 album by Canadian metal band The Agonist
 Prisoner (Cher album), 1979
 The Prisoner (album),  a 1969 album by Herbie Hancock
 Prisoner (The Jezabels album), 2011
 Prisoner (Ryan Adams album), 2017

Songs 
 "Prisoner" (311 song), 1997
 "Prisoner" (Dokken song), 1988
 "The Prisoner" (Howard Jones song), 1989
 "Prisoner" (Jeffree Star song)
 "Prisoner" (The Weeknd song) featuring Lana Del Rey, 2015
 "Prisoner" (Miley Cyrus song) featuring Dua Lipa, 2020
 "Prisoner" (Dance Gavin Dance song), 2020
 "Prisoner" (Love Theme from Eyes of Laura Mars), by Barbra Streisand from the 1978 film
 "The Prisoner", by The Clash released on Black Market Clash
 "The Prisoner", by England Dan & John Ford Coley from Nights Are Forever
 "The Prisoner", by Iron Maiden from The Number of the Beast
 "Prisoners", by John Denver from Rocky Mountain High
 "The Prisoner", by Roger Daltrey from One of the Boys
 "Prisoner", by Ryan Adams from Prisoner
 "Prisoner", by Steve Angello from Wild Youth
 "The Prisoner", by Tears For Fears from The Hurting
 "Prisoner", by The Jezabels from Prisoner
 "Prisoners", by The Vapors from the Canadian release of New Clear Days

Other uses
 The Prisoners (painting), an 1883 painting by Polish painter Jacek Malczewski
 The Prisoners (Goya), a series of three etchings by Francisco Goya
 "The Prisoner", a ring name of professional wrestler Kevin Wacholz
 The Prisoner (video game), 1980